The 2022 Postnord UCI WWT Vårgårda West Sweden Team time trial  was a road bicycle race.  It was the 17th round of the 2022 UCI Women's World Tour. It was held on 6 August 2022, in Vårgårda, Sweden. The TTT was ridden on a 36 km long course, starting in Vårgårda and going out and back to Herrljunga.

Teams

Fourteen professional teams each with a maximum of six riders, started the race:

UCI Women's WorldTeams

 
 
 
 
 
 
 
 

UCI Women's Continental Teams

Results

External links

References

Open de Suède Vårgårda
Postnord UCI WWT Vargarda
Postnord UCI WWT Vargarda
UCI Women's World Tour races
Postnord UCI WWT Vargarda